Laura Bromwell (May 17, 1897 – June 5, 1921) was an early 20th-century American aviatrix. She held the loop the loop record and a speed record. She was killed in an aviation accident in 1921.

Biography
Bromwell was born on May 17, 1897 in Cincinnati, Ohio.

Bromwell received her pilot's license in 1919. She was the first female member of the New York Aerial Police Reserve.

Bromwell set a loop the loop record of 87 loops in 1 hour and 15 minutes on August 20, 1920. She extended this to 199 loops in 1 hour and 20 minutes on May 15, 1921.

Death
On June 5, 1921, Bromwell was performing stunts in a borrowed Canadian plane at Mitchel Field in Mineola, Long Island when the plane motor stopped. The plane crashed to the ground killing Bromwell.

References

External links
 Laura Bromwell at Early Birds of Aviation

1897 births
1921 deaths
Accidental deaths in New York (state)
American aviation record holders
American women aviation record holders
Aviation pioneers
Aviators from Ohio
Aviators killed in aviation accidents or incidents in the United States
People from Cincinnati
Victims of aviation accidents or incidents in 1921
20th-century American women
20th-century American people